Pour la suite du monde (also known as For Those Who Will Follow; Of Whales, the Moon, and Men, or The Moontrap in English) is a 1963 Canadian documentary film produced by the National Film Board of Canada and directed by Michel Brault, Marcel Carrière and Pierre Perrault. It is the first of Perrault's Isle-aux-Coudres Trilogy–Le règne du jour (The Times That Are) followed in 1967, Les voitures d'eau (The River Schooners) in 1968.

Synopsis
The film is a work of ethnofiction. It shows life in a small isolated community, when the influence of the Catholic Church in Quebec was still strong.

For centuries the inhabitants of Ile-aux-Coudres, a small island in the St. Lawrence River, trapped beluga whales by sinking a weir of saplings into the offshore mud at low tide. After 1920, the practice was abandoned. In 1962, a team of National Film Board of Canada filmmakers led by director Perrault and cinematographer Brault arrived on the island to make a cinéma-vérité documentary about the people and their isolated life. They encouraged the islanders to revive the practice of beluga fishing. The live animal they caught was then driven on a truck to an aquarium in New York City.

The film also shows the daily life of the islanders, and their celebrations, such as the festival at mid-Lent (mi-carême).

Cast
 Léopold Tremblay as Marchand and president of the new beluga fishing co.
 Alexis Tremblay as Cultivateur et politicien
 Abel Harvey as Capitaine et maître de pêche
 Louis Harvey as Cultivateur et chantre d'église
 Joachim Harvey as Capitaine du Nord de l'Île
 Stanley Jackson as Narrator

Alternate English versions and titles
The film has been screened in various versions and with no less than four English-language titles. At its 1963 Cannes premiere, it was billed as For Those Who Will Follow. The NFB has also promoted the film in English as Of Whales, the Moon and Men  or The Moontrap, depending upon whether it was the 105 minute or 84 minute version, respectively. The release of a 2007 "Île-aux-Coudres Trilogy" DVD trilogy also translates the film title as For the Ones to Come.

The film is commonly referred to as simply Pour la suite du monde in both French and English.

Reception
The resulting film was hugely popular in Quebec, and today is recognized as a classic of Canadian cinema. Pour la suite du monde has been consistently ranked by critics as one of the best ever made and it represents a major development in the Direct Cinema movement, moving away from simple observation to a more immediate participation and a great emphasis on the words of the people portrayed. Pour la suite du monde was the first Quebec film shown at the Cannes Film Festival.

Quebecois filmmaker Denis Villeneuve declares that Perrault's "Île-aux-Coudres Trilogy" is "amongst the most beautiful films he has ever seen". It remains a major source of inspiration and influence for him.

Awards
 Ibero-American-Filipino Documentary Film Contest, Bilbao, Spain: First Prize, Gold Medal, 1963
 16th Canadian Film Awards, Toronto: Film of the Year, 1964
 16th Canadian Film Awards, Toronto: Special Award "in recognition of its visual qualities, perceptions and artistry”, 1964
 Évreux International Short Film Festival, Évreux, France: Grand Prize, Golden Viking, 1964
 Columbus International Film & Animation Festival, Columbus, Ohio: Chris Award, First Prize 1966
 Melbourne Film Festival, Melbourne: Diploma of Merit, 1966
Sardinia International Ethnographic Film Festival, Nuoro, Italy: Special Mention, 1994
 Toronto International Film Festival, Toronto: Canada’s Ten-Best Films, 8th Place, 1984<ref>"Top 10 Canadian Films of All Time," The Canadian Encyclopedia, 2012, URL accessed April 28, 2013.</ref>

See also
 Docufiction
 List of docufiction films
 Man of Aran'', a 1934 film centred around reviving a shark fishing tradition

References

Works cited

External links

Watch Pour la suite du monde at NFB.ca

1963 films
1963 documentary films
1960s French-language films
Canadian black-and-white films
Canadian docufiction films
Ethnofiction films
Films about whaling
Films directed by Michel Brault
Films directed by Pierre Perrault
Films set in Quebec
National Film Board of Canada documentaries
Best Picture Genie and Canadian Screen Award winners
Films shot in Quebec
Films directed by Marcel Carrière
Whaling in Canada
French-language Canadian films
1960s Canadian films